Bush commonly refers to:
 Shrub, a small or medium woody plant

Bush, Bushes, or the bush may also refer to:

People
 Bush (surname), including any of several people with that name
Bush family, a prominent American family that includes:
George H. W. Bush (1924–2018), former president of the United States
George W. Bush (born 1946), former president of the United States and son of George H. W. Bush
Jeb Bush (born 1953), former governor of Florida and candidate for US president
Vannevar Bush (1890–1974), American engineer, inventor and science administrator
Kate Bush (born 1958), British singer, songwriter, pianist, dancer, and record producer

Places

United States
 Bush, Illinois
 Bush, Louisiana
 Bush, Washington
 Bush, former name of the Ralph Waldo Emerson House in Concord, Massachusetts
 The Bush (Alaska)
"The Bush," a small neighborhood within Chicago's community area of South Chicago

Elsewhere
 Bush, Cornwall, a hamlet in England
 Bush Island (Nunavut), Canada
 Bush, a part of the Manawatū-Whanganui region, North Island, New Zealand

Brands
 Bush (automobile), an early American car company
 Bush (brand), in British electronics
 Bush Brothers and Company, a food company commonly known as "Bush's"
 Bush, a Belgian beer made by Dubuisson Brewery

Film
Bush, the working title of 2008 film W.
Bush, the working title of 2019 film The Gentlemen

Music
 Bush (British band), a rock band formed in London in 1992
 Bush (Canadian band), a Canadian rock band in the early 1970s, and their self-titled album from 1970
 Bush (album), by Snoop Dogg, 2015
 "Bushes", a song from 1 Giant Leap's 2002 self-titled album

Other uses
 The bush, a term for a natural undeveloped area
 Bushing (disambiguation), or bush, a term for several types of mechanical and electrical fittings
 USS Bush, several ships with the name
 Bush Rugby Football Union, or simply Bush, a former team, now combined with Wairarapa
 Slang term for (untrimmed) pubic hair

See also
 Bush House (disambiguation)
 Bush Terminal, in Brooklyn, New York
 Bush Tower, a building in Manhattan, New York
 Bushcraft, wilderness survival skills
 Bushfire, a wildfire
 Bushing (disambiguation)